Adam Fiut (Kraków, June 17, 1933 – near Lubień, December 14, 1966) was a Polish film and theater actor.

Filmography

References

External links 

1933 births
1966 deaths
Polish male film actors
Polish male stage actors
Road incident deaths in Poland
Articles needing additional references from February 2021